Ranajagjitsinha Padmsinha Patil (born 30 October 1971) is a member of 14th Vidhan Sabha, lower house of Legislature of Maharashtra, from Tuljapur in Maharashtra state in India.  He joined the Bharatiya Janata Party in the presence of Bharatiya Janata Party President Amit Shah and he was elected to the 14th VidhanSabha on a Bharatiya Janata Party ticket in the October 2019 state elections in Tuljapur Vidhan Sabha constituency. He was elected to the VidhanSabha from the Osmanabad Vidhan Sabha in the October 2014 state elections. He was a member of the Maharashtra Legislative Council for 2 terms 2004-2008 & 2008-2014. He was the first and youngest ever minister to be inducted into the cabinet and subsequently made a MLC. His family had represented the Osmanabad (Vidhan Sabha constituency) 10 times from 1978 to 2019 in the Maharashtra Vidhan Sabha. He was handpicked by Sharad Pawar in the Maharashtra Cabinet at a young age of 32 years and replaced his father Padamsinh Bajirao Patil in the district and state politics. He is the nephew of ex. Deputy Chief Minister of Maharashtra Ajit Pawar. He won the 2014 Vidhan Sabha elections with the highest number of votes in the district. He and his father have been representing Osmanabad since the past 40 years. His wife is the Vice President of the Zilla Parishad of Osmanabad. He has maintained control of Municipal councils, Market Committees and Societies in Osmanabad. He controls the Zilla Parishad of Osmanabad and also the Osmanabad District Central Cooperative Bank, where his party Bharatiya Janata Party has full majority.
His father  Padamsinh Bajirao Patil was a minister in the Maharashtra Government for more than 20 years.  He is former deputy speaker of the Maharashtra Vidhan Sabha, Deputy Opposition Leader and also the State President of Sharad Pawar's Congress(S).  He was responsible for constructing the largest number of Kolhapur Type ("K.T.") dams in his home turf Osmanabad and was also responsible for making Osmanabad the most irrigated district in the otherwise backward and largely arid Marathwada region.  Ranajagjitsinha Patil was a Minister of State for Industries, Revenue, Agriculture, Cultural Affairs, Protocol, Employment and Employment with guarantee scheme, Parliamentary Affairs, GAD. He held the responsibility of six portfolios in his first induction as Minister.

Positions held

 2004-2009          State Minister Industries, Revenue, Agriculture, Cultural Affairs, Protocol, Employment and Employment with guarantee scheme,    Parliamentary Affairs, General Administration.
 2004-2008         Member of the Maharashtra Legislative Council ("MLC")
1st Term
 2008-2014         Member of the Maharashtra Legislative Council (“MLC”)
2nd Term
 2014-2019          Member of the Maharashtra Legislative Assembly ("MLA") Osmanabad Vidhan Sabha
3rd Term
 2019-Incumbent Member of the Maharashtra Legislative Assembly (“MLA”) Tuljapur Vidhan Sabha
4th Term

References

India MPs 2009–2014
Indian prisoners and detainees
People from Osmanabad district
Marathi politicians
Living people
1971 births
Nationalist Congress Party politicians from Maharashtra
Maharashtra MLAs 1978–1980
Maharashtra MLAs 1985–1990
Lok Sabha members from Maharashtra
United Progressive Alliance candidates in the 2014 Indian general election
Deputy Speakers of the Maharashtra Legislative Assembly
People from Marathwada
Maharashtra district councillors
Bharatiya Janata Party politicians from Maharashtra